Xinhai Geming or Xin Hai Ge Ming may refer to:

Xinhai Revolution, a revolution in 1911 that overthrew the Qing Dynasty and established the Republic of China
1911 (film), a 2011 Chinese film, its Chinese title reads Xinhai Geming
1911 Revolution (TV series), a 2011 Chinese television series